Sauli Väisänen (born 5 June 1994) is a Finnish professional footballer who plays as a defender for Serie B club Cosenza and the Finland national team. He began his senior club career playing for Honka , before signing with AIK at age 20 in 2014.

Väisänen made his international debut for Finland in October 2016, at the age of 22.  He appeared in 5 out of 10 of Finland's UEFA Euro 2020 qualification matches and helped Finland national team for the first time reach European Football Championship tournament's group stage.

Club career

Honka
Väisänen made his first team debut during season 2013, in a match against KuPS. He was known as a crucial part of the Honka reserve team Pallohonka.

AIK
In summer 2014 Väisänen joined AIK. He spent 4 seasons in the club. During season 2015 he was loaned to HIFK.

SPAL and loan to Crotone
Väisänen made his Seria A debut on 20 August 2017 in a match against Lazio. He was loaned to Crotone for season 2018–19.

Chievo
On 24 August 2019, Väisänen signed to Serie B club Chievo a deal. He made his debut in Chievo in a 1–1 home tie with Empoli on 30 August 2019.

Cosenza
On 16 August 2021, he joined Cosenza. He made his debut on 22 August 2021 playing full 90 minutes in a match against Ascoli.

International career

Finland youth teams

Väisänen made his debut in international football on 5 March 2014 at the age 19 when he was called to represent Finland U21 in a match against San Marino U21. During years 2014-2016 Väisänen was a part of the Finnish national youth squad, which he also captained on occasion.

Finland first team

Väisänen made his FIFA World Cup qualification match debut on 6 October 2016 on Laugardalsvöllur when Hans Backe chose him to the starting eleven for a match against Iceland.

Väisänen was called up for the UEFA Euro 2020 pre-tournament friendly match against Sweden on 29 May 2021. He was nominated to the Finland national team for the UEFA Euro 2020 tournament but had to withdraw due to an injury and was replaced by Niko Hämäläinen.

Personal life
Väisänen's mother Anna-Liisa Tilus-Väisänen is a prominent television presenter for Yle TV1 and Miss World 1984 semi-finalist. His younger brother Leo Väisänen is also a footballer.

Career statistics

Club

International

References

 Profile at veikkausliiga.com

External links

 Cosenza Calcio official profile 
 Sauli Väisänen – SPL competition record
 
 
 
 

1994 births
Living people
Footballers from Helsinki
Association football defenders
Finnish footballers
Finland youth international footballers
Finland under-21 international footballers
Finland international footballers
FC Jokerit players
AC Allianssi players
PK-35 Vantaa (men) players
Helsingin Jalkapalloklubi players
FC Honka players
Pallohonka players
AIK Fotboll players
HIFK Fotboll players
S.P.A.L. players
F.C. Crotone players
A.C. ChievoVerona players
Cosenza Calcio players
Veikkausliiga players
Kakkonen players
Allsvenskan players
Serie A players
Serie B players
Finnish expatriate footballers
Finnish expatriate sportspeople in Sweden
Expatriate footballers in Sweden
Finnish expatriate sportspeople in Italy
Expatriate footballers in Italy